Jeffrey Lynn Collins (born December 19, 1955) is a  former Republican member of the North Carolina General Assembly. He represented the 25th district from 2011 until 2019.

Honors

In 2018, Collins was listed as a Champion of the Family in the NC Values Coalition Scorecard.

References

External links

Living people
North Carolina Republicans
21st-century American politicians
1955 births